Mukhamadmurod Abdurakhmonov (born 29 November 1986) is a Tajikistani judoka. He competed at the 2016 Summer Olympics in the men's +100 kg event, in which he was eliminated in the first round by Alex García Mendoza.

References

External links
 
 
 
 

1986 births
Living people
Tajikistani male judoka
Olympic judoka of Tajikistan
Judoka at the 2016 Summer Olympics
Judoka at the 2010 Asian Games
Judoka at the 2014 Asian Games
Asian Games competitors for Tajikistan